Rob Chapman may refer to:

 Rob Chapman (journalist) (born 1954), English rock musician, journalist, teacher and writer
 Rob Chapman (businessman) (born 1964), Australian businessman
 Rob Chapman (guitarist) (born 1975), English rock musician, guitarist, web-based teacher and entrepreneur

See also
Robert Chapman (disambiguation)